The 2014 Copa do Brasil de Futebol Feminino was the eighth staging of the competition. The competition started on January 29, 2014, and concluded on April 15, 2014. 32 clubs of all regions of Brazil participated of the cup, which was organized by the Brazilian Football Confederation (CBF).

Ferroviária won the final.

Competition format
The competition was contested by 32 clubs in a knock-out format where all rounds were played over two legs and the away goals rule was used, but in the first two rounds, if the away team won the first leg with an advantage of at least three goals, the second leg was not played and the club automatically qualified to the next round.

Table

Final

References

External links
Official website

2014
2014 domestic association football cups
Copa